Do Konarun-e Zirdu (also Romanized as Do Konārūn-e Zīrdū; also known as Do Konarān, Do Konārūn, and Tūgeh Do Konārūn) is a village in Rostam-e Yek Rural District, in the Central District of Rostam County, Fars Province, Iran. At the 2006 census, its population was 286, in 56 families.

References 

Populated places in Rostam County